Note: This ship should not be confused with two other World War I-era ships named USS Mystery.

The first USS Mystery (SP-428) was an armed motorboat that served in the United States Navy as a patrol vessel from 1917 to 1919.Mystery was built in 1917 by Luders Marine Construction Company at Stamford, Connecticut, as a private motorboat of the same name. Her design was similar to one prepared in 1916 by Luders Marine for a Navy patrol boat, and it is likely that her owner, Mr. Ralph Pulitzer of New York City, intended from the first to make her available to the U.S. Navy in the event the United States entered World War I.

On 18 June 1917, the U.S. Navy acquired Mystery for World War I service under a free lease from Pulitzer, and she was enrolled in the Naval Coast Defense Reserve. Pulitzer delivered her to the Navy on 24 July 1917. She was commissioned as USS Mystery (SP-428) on 25 July 1917.

Assigned to the 2nd Naval District, Mystery operated from the section base at Block Island, Rhode Island. She patrolled the coastal waters of Connecticut and Rhode Island as well as the approaches to Long Island Sound. The last few months of her career overlapped with that of the second USS Mystery (ID-2744).Mystery'' was returned to her owner on 11 January 1919.

Notes

References

Department of the Navy: Naval Historical Center: Online Library of Selected Images: Civilian Ships: Mystery (Motor Boat, 1917). Served as USS Mystery (SP-428) in 1917-1919
NavSource Online: Section Patrol Craft Photo Archive Mystery (SP 428)

Patrol vessels of the United States Navy
World War I patrol vessels of the United States
Ships built in Stamford, Connecticut
1917 ships